The Doud Building, also known as the James Doud Building is a historic commercial building in Carmel-by-the-Sea, California. James Cooper Doud established the building in 1932, built by master builder Michael J. Murphy as a mixed-use retail shop and residence. It is an example of a Spanish Colonial Revival architecture style building. The structure is recognized as an important commercial building in the city's Downtown Conservation District Historic Property Survey, and was nominated and submitted to the California Register of Historical Resources on February 21, 2003. The building is now occupied by the Mad Dogs & Englishmen Bike Shop and the Carmel Sport clothing store.

History

The Doud Building was established for businessman and real estate developer James Cooper Doud and his family, in 1932 as a mixed-use retail shop and residence, located on the southwest corner of Ocean Avenue and Mission Street in Carmel-by-the-Sea, California, opposite the  Reardon Building, which it meant to mirror.

It is a two-story wood-frame, concrete, stucco Spanish Colonial-style building with the original corner tower. The Reardon Building, directly across Ocean Avenue, has a similar tower. The ground level has a succession of large, fixed pane arcade show windows that were created in a 1970 remodel that cost $15,000. The upstairs multipaned inset casement windows with original extended wrought iron balconies and railings are accessible by double-pane French doors that lead to an office space that was originally an apartment. Inset Moorish tiles and beveled corners cover the tower that is topped with a hipped Spanish tile roof. A second story insert balcony has a diamond pattern railing. There is a basement retail shop to the rear of the building.

The building qualified for inclusion in the city's Downtown Conservation District Historic Property Survey, and has been nominated and submitted to the California Register of Historical Resources on February 21, 2003. The property is significant under the California Register criterion 1, in the area of history, as a Spanish Colonial Revival commercial building that was built on the site of the Manzanita Club that was the main social gathering place in Carmel from 1916 to 1926. The building was designed and built by master builder Michael J. Murphy in 1932 at a cost of $6,300. Developer Samuel Finley Brown Morse made use of this style for houses built in Pebble Beach, California, and the style was used in downtown Carmel in the late 1920s and 1930s.

The Ocean Avenue property has been the home of many businesses over the years. It was the site of Doctor Becks’s Drug store built by Hugh W. Comstock. The drug store was later demolished, and M. J. Murphy built the Doud Building as an altered Spanish Colonial Revival for commercial shops. Several additions and remodeling’s took place over the years. The upstairs apartment was converted to an office and studio space after World War II. Local architect Robert Jones used the office during the 1950s and 1960s. In 1970, Comstock did a remodel of the former dry cleaners into an Orange Julius corner store for $15,000.

The building ajacent to the Doud Building was the Spanish-style Carmel Theater designed by A. A. Cantin. It operating from 1936 to 1959 on the southeast corner of Ocean Avenue and Mission Street. The building had arcades with three storefronts, a tower, and a covered balcony. One section of the building is now Tiffany & Co., but the theater was demolished to make room for today's Carmel Plaza.

James C. Doud

James Cooper Doud "Jimmy" (1902-1984) was from the pioneering Doud family, which arrived in Monterey in the 1840s. H Doud was stationed with the Army at the Presidio of San Francisco during World War II. He worked in real estate for the Del Monte Prosperities Company out of the Hotel Del Monte. In the 1920s, he worked for  William Wrigley and was sales manager for the Arizona Biltmore project that included a golf course and homes. After the death of his father in 1929, he returned to Monterey to run the family ranches near King City, California and the old Soberanes Ranch (now Garrapata State Park), below Carmel Highlands, California, where he took an active part in roundup, branding, and in cattle drives. Doud was active in the development and sale of subdivisions in and near Carmel. Paradise Park, east of Carpenter Street and north of Ocean Avenue, became a subdivision in February 1918 was acquired by Doud and attorney William L. Hudson in 1940. Throughout the 1940s, they promoted Paradise Park and sold lots, with streets named Escole, Sterling, and Perry Newberry.

Doud joined Corum Jackson as a partner in the Carmel Realty Company. He also purchased property adjacent to the Mission Tract and Rancho Rio Vista. James Doud also owned  The Doud Arcade that was a two-story commercial building built in 1961. It is the home for local craftsmen, which has offices on the second floor and shops and restaurants on the ground floor. It is located on Ocean Avenue SW of San Carolos Street. The arcade connects with The Doud Craft Studios, which was home to the Italian restaurant Paolina's. Doud retired in 1969.

See also
List of Historic Buildings in Carmel-by-the-Sea

References

External links

 Downtown Conservation District Historic Property Survey

1932 establishments in California
Carmel-by-the-Sea, California
Buildings and structures in Monterey County, California
Spanish Colonial Revival architecture in California